The Cymbidieae is a tribe of plants within the family Orchidaceae.

See also
 Taxonomy of the Orchidaceae

References 

 
Epidendroideae tribes